Aralia excelsa is a species of flowering plant in the family Araliaceae. It is native to Mexico, Central America, northern South America and parts of the Caribbean.

This species is a shrub or tree up to 20 meters tall with tripinnate leaves and umbels of flowers.

References

excelsa
Flora of Mexico
Flora of South America